I Can See Your Voice Indonesia is an Indonesian television mystery music game show series based on the South Korean programme of the same name. Since its premiere on 29 August 2016, it has aired five seasons on MNCTV.

Gameplay

Format
Presented with a group of six "mystery singers" identified only by their occupation, a guest artist must attempt to eliminate bad singers from the group without ever hearing them sing, assisted by clues and a celebrity panel over the course of three rounds. At the end of the game, the last remaining mystery singer is revealed as either good or bad by means of a duet between them and one of the guest artists.

The Indonesian version has two different formats:

Original format
Under the original format, the guest artist can eliminate one or two mystery singers after each round. The game concludes with the last mystery singer standing that depends on outcome of a duet performance with a guest artist.

Battle format (season 3)
Under the battle format (adopted from Giọng ải giọng ai), both opponents can eliminate one singer each in the first two rounds, and then both can choose one singer each to join the final performance in the third round. At the end of the game, the conditions for mystery singers chosen by opposing guest artists depending on the outcome of a final performance, if:

Rewards
If the singer is good, he/she will feature on a privilege video; if the singer is bad, he/she wins  until the fourth season, and then  since the fifth season.

Rounds
Each episode presents the guest artist with six people whose identities and singing voices are kept concealed until they are eliminated to perform on the "stage of truth" or remain in the end to perform the final duet.

Notes:

Production

Background and development
Media Nusantara Citra first announced the development of the series in July 2016. It is produced by MNC Entertainment; the staff team is managed by executive producer Michael Sitorus, producer Maartvi Prastowo, and director Endah Hari Utami.

Filming
Tapings for the programme took place at the MNC Studio Towers in Kebon Jeruk, Jakarta.

In the fifth season, the programme was filmed under health and safety protocols due to the COVID-19 pandemic.

Broadcast

History
I Can See Your Voice Indonesia debuted on 28 August 2016. For the second season, the first part premiered on 30 January 2017, continuing with the second part on 15 May 2017. In the third season having premiered on 11 March 2018,  defeated Iis Dahlia in the first episode under battle format on 17 June 2018. Despite the fourth season having aired entirely in 2019, it premiered on New Year's Eve of 2018. The fifth season has an initial premiere on 18 January 2021, but it was delayed until it happened on 25 January 2021.

Special episode and companion events
In the second season on 24 June 2017, it aired the first episode featuring an entire lineup of kids as mystery singers, played by fellow child guest artist . 

For an entire fourth season, TikTok was used as evidential piece in the lip sync round. After the fifth-season finale, Bigo Live then spawned a companion event titled I Can See Your Talent, in which three highest-voting participants would allow to perform a duet alongside one of the guest artists.

Cast
The series employs a team of "celebrity panelists" who decipher mystery singers' evidences throughout the game. Alongside with full-timers and additional ones, guest panelists also appear since the first season. Throughout its broadcast, the programme has assigned 9 different panelists. The original members consist of Wendy Armoko, and Ayu Ting Ting.

Series overview

References 

I Can See Your Voice Indonesia
2010s Indonesian television series
2020s Indonesian television series
2016 Indonesian television series debuts
Indonesian game shows
Indonesian television series based on South Korean television series
Indonesian-language television shows
MNCTV original programming